Savvas Houvartas, Greek: Σάββας Χουβαρτάς, a guitarist and songwriter, was born in 1968 in Pentayia, Cyprus. His compositions, are influenced by jazz or rock, and are instrumental or with Greek lyrics; overall are close to the mediterranean music; improvisation is another characteristic of his music. Savvas regularly performed his music at festivals and various venues. Amongst the festivals are the Etnofest World Culture Festival in Serbia, Kypria festival, the University of Cyprus Cultural Festival, and Pomos Paradise Jazz Festival. 'Erimos' a composition of Savvas has been included in the 2007 Europavox Festival compilation CD.

Discography
2010 'A minor JAM'
2007 Europavox Festival (France) Compilation CD - Composition 'Erimos' under World Music category
2007 'Acoustic'

References

External links
Savvas Houvartas website 
Etno Festival Palić, Serbia 
Festival Europavox, France

1968 births
Living people
Cypriot musicians
Cypriot guitarists
Cypriot songwriters